Lake Glubokoye (literally: "Lake Deep") is a lake near Norilsk, Russia.

Geography
Lake Glubokoye is located just south of Lake Lama on the Eastern edge of the Putorana Plateau. It is connected with Lake Melkoye ("Lake Shallow") by the Glubokaya River. Its area is 136 km² and its average depth: 16 m.

References

External links
Map
Putorana Plateau at Natural Heritage Protection Fund

Glubokoye